The 1987–88 season was the 79th year of football played by Dundee United, and covers the period from 1 July 1987 to 30 June 1988. United finished in fifth place, securing UEFA Cup Winners' Cup football for the following season, despite their Scottish Cup final defeat to Celtic (Celtic qualified for European competition as league winners).

Match results
Dundee United played a total of 60 competitive matches during the 1987–88 season. The team finished fifth in the Scottish Premier Division.

In the cup competitions, United lost in the final of the Scottish Cup to Celtic and lost in the Skol Cup quarter-finals to rivals Dundee. Czechoslovakian side Vítkovice ensured United wouldn't repeat last season's UEFA Cup run, beating them in the second round.

Legend

All results are written with Dundee United's score first.

Premier Division

Scottish Cup

Skol Cup

UEFA Cup

Player details
During the 1987–88 season, United used 31 different players comprising four nationalities. Maurice Malpas featured in all but one of United's 60 matches. The table below shows the number of appearances and goals scored by each player.

|}

Goalscorers
United had 19 players score with the team scoring 83 goals in total. The top goalscorer was Iain Ferguson, who finished the season with 16 goals.

Discipline
During the 1987–88 season, two United players were sent off. Statistics for cautions are unavailable.

Team statistics

League table

Transfers

In
The club signed three players during the season with a total public cost of at least £200,000 (one figure unknown).

Out
Four players were sold by the club during the season with a public total of at least £80,000 (some figures unavailable).

Playing kit

The jerseys were sponsored by Belhaven Beers for the first time.

See also
1987–88 in Scottish football

References

External links
Glenrothes Arabs 1987–88 season review

1987-88
Scottish football clubs 1987–88 season